Mugawade is a village in the Belgaum district of Karnataka, India.

References

Villages in Belagavi district